The Marathon Family (lit. Marathon Runners Do a Lap of Honour, or often simply Maratonci, lit. The Marathon Runners) is a 1982 Yugoslav black comedy film written by Dušan Kovačević and directed by Serbian director Slobodan Šijan. It has become a cult film in Serbia and other countries from the former Yugoslavia region and is regarded as one of the classics of Yugoslav Serbian cinematography.

Plot
The story takes place in an unnamed small Serbian town in 1935, and focuses on the Topalović family consisting of six generations of undertakers: 
 gravely ill Pantelija, 
 Maksimilijan who uses a wheelchair, is mute and nearly deaf, 
 rheumatic Aksentije, 
 sober-minded Milutin, 
 impulsive and narcissistic Laki, and 
 young and naive Mirko.

Constantly bickering amongst each other, the latest family arguments arise from the youngest son, Mirko, not wanting to continue the family business of coffin-making. Deeply in love with a local girl Kristina, the daughter of a local hoodlum Bili Piton, he's looking to avoid the career path of his father, grandfather, great grandfather, etc.

Though operating out of a prominently located shop in the town, Topalovićs' business is mostly based on illegal activities. Instead of making brand new coffins, they simply recycle already used ones with the help of Bili Piton, whose men dig them out from the local cemetery during the night. Once they get their hands on the coffins that had been dug up, Topalovićs simply refurbish them and sell them as new, thereby making a large profit with very little overhead. Based on mutual financial interest, the business relationship between Topalovićs and Bili is deteriorating by the day as they owe him a large sum of money for the past services rendered and show no intention of paying him.

In parallel, Topalovićs are in the finishing stages of building a modern crematory on which they're placing high hopes as the future source of income.

One day, the oldest Topalović, Pantelija, dies and leaves family inheritance to himself because he does not trust his successors. Topalovićs leave business with Bili Piton and he threatens to report them to the police for killing a man in a car accident. Bili's daughter, Mirko's love Kristina wishes to become an actress in (mostly pornographic) movies made by Mirko's best friend Đenka. However, she cheats on Mirko with Đenka, so outraged Mirko kills her when he finds out. He returns to his family and makes himself their leader by force, while Đenka is accidentally burned alive by the deaf Maksimilijan, while repairing the crematorium. The movie ends with a showdown between the Topalovićs and Bili Piton, in which Bili Piton is killed, and then a chase between Topalovićs and the police, with a scene abruptly cut just as raging Mirko attempts to run over a police officer fallen from a bicycle.

Cast

Bogdan Diklić as Mirko Topalović
Bata Stojković as Laki Topalović
Pavle Vujisić as Milutin Topalović
Mija Aleksić as Aksentije Topalović
Milivoje Tomić as Maksimilijan Topalović
Radislav Lazarević as Pantelija Topalović
Zoran Radmilović as Billy the Python (Bili Piton)
Seka Sablić as Kristina
Bora Todorović as Đenka
Melita Bihali as Olja the maid
Fahro Konjhodžić as Mr Rajković
Veljko Mandić as Rajković's brother
Bata Paskaljević as Older gendarme
Dragoljub-Gula Milosavljević as Mourner (as Dragoljub Milosavljević)
Miroslav Jovanović as 1st Twin 
Dragoslav Jovanović as 2nd Twin 
Milovan Tasić as The Giant
Milan Janjić as Midget
Ras Rastoder as Younger gendarme
Stanojlo Milinković as Villager
Vojislav Micović as Old man at cemetery
Nebojša Terzić as Priest Đura
Nikola Brodac as Deceased

Awards
The Marathon Family won two awards in 1982, including the Jury Prize at the Montréal World Film Festival and the "Best Actress" award at the Pula Film Festival, which went to Seka Sablić for her portrayal of Kristina.

See also
List of Yugoslavian films

References

External links

 

1982 films
1980s black comedy films
Serbian black comedy films
1980s Serbian-language films
Films about death
Yugoslav films based on plays
Films based on works by Dušan Kovačević
Films about feuds
Films set in Serbia
Films set in Yugoslavia
Films set in 1935
Films directed by Slobodan Šijan
Films with screenplays by Dušan Kovačević
Yugoslav black comedy films
1982 comedy films
Films about the Serbian Mafia